Bleu noir is the eighth studio album by French singer Mylène Farmer, released 6 December 2010. Farmer's label set up a web site to promote the album on 3 November 2010. For some of her fans this album is a return to her roots. It has drawn favorable comparisons to Innamoramento and also the albums prior to Anamorphosée. This album seems to depict the artist as a woman at her prime, confident in her achievements and able to express herself without sacrificing her integrity.

Farmer has written the lyrics and Moby, Archive and RedOne have composed the music for the album. The first single from the album is "Oui mais... non", composed by RedOne. The single was released on 11 October 2010.

The music video of "Leila" premiered at the album's temporary website on 22 November 2010, but there has not been any plan to release the song as a single.

The album entered the French Digital Chart at number one, with over 9,100 downloads. The next week, the album also entered the physical chart at number one, selling 139,176 units in the first week. Both performances were deemed records in terms of sales. Bleu noir is Farmer's first studio album since 1991's L'Autre to outperform its predecessor in terms of national sales. In 2010, Bleu noir has sold 328,783 copies (312,978 physical and 15,805 digital).

On 22 January 2011, it was revealed that the second single would be the title track of the same name and will be released the following month. However, the release of the single was delayed due to the production of remixes of "Bleu noir".

The music video of "Bleu noir" premiered at the album's temporary website on 16 March 2011.

On 4 December 2013, "Diabolique mon ange" was released on French radio as single from Farmer's sixth live album, Timeless 2013.

Track listing

Charts

Weekly charts

Year-end charts

Certifications and sales

Release history

See also
 List of number-one singles of 2010 (France)

References

2010 albums
Mylène Farmer albums
Polydor Records albums
Albums produced by Moby
Albums produced by RedOne
French-language albums